In taxonomy, Methanimicrococcus is a genus of the Methanosarcinaceae. The members of this genus have been found in pharmaceutical wastewater, and they can contribute to the degradation of organic contaminants.

References

Further reading

Scientific journals

Scientific books

Scientific databases

External links

Archaea genera
Euryarchaeota